Prudy is a rural locality (a village) in Seletskoye Rural Settlement, Suzdalsky District, Vladimir Oblast, Russia. The population was 10 as of 2010. There are 2 streets.

Geography 
Prudy is located on the Uyechka River, 18 km southeast of Suzdal (the district's administrative centre) by road. Sanino is the nearest rural locality.

References 

Rural localities in Suzdalsky District